Sophos PureMessage is an anti-spam program by Sophos plc, which is aimed primarily at corporate environments.

Sophos PureMessage for Microsoft Exchange — part of Email Security and Data Protection — blocks spam, viruses, spyware and phishing. Scanning all inbound, outbound and internal email and Exchange message stores, it proactively protects against email-borne threats, and prevents confidential data being lost.

Anti-spam